Nova Airways, formerly Nova Airlines (from 2006 to 2011), is a passenger airline based in Khartoum, Sudan.

Destinations
 Sudan
Dongola - Dongola Airport
El Fasher - El Fasher Airport
Khartoum - Khartoum International Airport Main Hub
Merowe - Merowe Airport
Nyala - Nyala Airport
Port Sudan - Port Sudan New International Airport

Fleet
The Nova Airways fleet comprises the following aircraft (as of February 2023):

References

External links
Nova Airways
Nova Airways Fleet

Airlines of Sudan
Airlines established in 2006
Companies based in Khartoum

id:Nova Airline